= Las Chacritas, Catamarca =

Coordinates: 27°41′13″S 65°55′26″W

Las Chacritas (Catamarca)
- Municipality and village
- Interactive map of Las Chacritas (Catamarca)
- Country: Argentina
- Province: Catamarca Province
- Time zone: UTC−3 (ART)

Las Chacritas (Catamarca) is a village and municipality in Catamarca Province in northwestern Argentina.
